Harold Froehlich may refer to:

Harold Vernon Froehlich (born 1932), American politician who served in the U.S. House of Representatives
Harold E. Froehlich (1923–2007), American engineer who designed deep-diving exploratory submarine